is a Japanese children's animated television program that follows the adventures of a young Felix the Cat and infant versions of the characters from Joe Oriolo's Felix television program from the 1950s. It is the third Felix television series. It was launched by Oriolo's son, Don Oriolo in 2000 with NHK Educational, NEC Interchannel and AEON Studios of Japan. The show consists of 26 half-hour episodes. It follows in the long line of "Baby Cartoon Revivals" alongside such shows as Muppet Babies, Baby Looney Tunes, Tom & Jerry Kids, and The Flintstone Kids. All 26 episodes were released in Bulgaria on 9 DVDs by A-Design. In Italy the series aired during 2008 on Rai 2. In 2010, DVDs have been released in Hungary as well.

The series became available on Peacock on July 15, 2020. It is also now available on The Roku Channel.

Summary 

This is the story of when Felix was still a small child and was called “Baby Felix”. He is so smart, full of curiosity, vitality and also has a big dream for his future. The story begins with a miracle. Baby Felix, who dreams of becoming a Major League player, incredibly travels forward in time to his future. There he meets the adult version of himself and discovers that he has become a Major League player!
Through many exciting adventures, the two become great friends.

Voice cast 
 Baby Felix: Yumi Touma (Japanese voice); Denise NeJame (English voice)
 Felix: Toshihiko Seki (Japanese voice); Don Oriolo (English voice)
 Marin Kitty/Baby Kitty: Ai Maeda (Japanese voice); Jennifer Brassard (English voice)
 Skippy: Motoko Kumai (Japanese voice) 
 Mookie: Noko Konoha (Japanese voice)
 Mimi: Atsuko Enomoto (Japanese voice); Jennifer Brassard (English voice)
 Tattoo: Hisayo Mochizuki (Japanese voice)
 Bull/Biff: Tesshō Genda (Japanese voice)
 Rock Bottom: Kōichi Nagano (Japanese voice)
 Zoo: Kōichi Sakaguchi (Japanese voice)
 Professor: Toshiyuki Morikawa (Japanese voice); Don Oriolo (English voice)
 Master Cylinder: Kōichi Nagano (Japanese voice); Don Oriolo (English voice)
 Poindexter: Kappei Yamaguchi (Japanese voice); Don Oriolo (English voice)
 Marty: Ryūsei Nakao (Japanese voice)
 Majorina/Esmeralda: Rei Sakuma (Japanese voice); Jennifer Brassard (English voice)
 Play-by-play Announcer: Showtaro Morikubo (Japanese voice)

Plots of Characters 
 Baby Felix: He is an 3-year old cat boy, he could do his powers of his magic bag who have given to Felix, he is an humming whistling cat boy (his whistling is not shown in this series, only Felix does), he has a crush on Baby Kitty since he was born, he often continues exploring time by time to visit his future self.
 Felix: He is Kitty's love interest, when he is the main protagonist with his past self, he became a Major League player, he often gives Baby Felix a magic bag and tells him to be careful.
 Marin Kitty/Baby Kitty: She is Baby Felix's love interest, she wants to become like the famous Kitty Kat, she fell in love with Baby Felix since she was born, and after all, she and Mimi are friends.
 Skippy: He is a dog who he plays baseball with Tattoo, he and Baby Felix know how to play baseball.
 Mookie: He is a mouse who loves to fishing, he is one of Baby Felix's pals.
 Mimi: She is a sweet and curious girl, she and Baby Kitty are friends.
 Tattoo: He is a bird who loves to whistle, he plays baseball with Skippy.
 Bull/Biff: They are the mean bulldogs, they want to bully Baby Felix who is getting a happy day with Baby Kitty.
 Rock Bottom: He is a former baseball player, he is also known as The Professor's servant.
 Zoo: An character who appears in the anime.
 Professor: He is the main antagonist of the series, he wants to stole Baby Felix's magic bag but he fails.
 Master Cylinder: He is The Professor's robot.
 Poindexter: He is The Professor's nephew, he certainly did not meet Felix.
 Marty: He is a martian who he kidnaps Baby Kitty.
 Majorina/Esmeralda: She is a witch who helps Baby Felix to fly with a broom.
 Play-by-play Announcer: He is the announcer of Kittenville.

Personalities 
 Baby Felix: Kind, sweet, caring
 Felix: Wonderful, brave, kind
 Marin Kitty/Baby Kitty: Beautiful, charming, glamorous
 Skippy: Clumsy, gentle, smart
 Mookie: Clumsy, funny, caring
 Mimi: Sweet, curious, kind
 Tattoo: Smart, genius, gentle
 Bull/Biff: Evil, prankster, ungood
 Rock Bottom: Evil, bad, strong
 Zoo: Loyal, genius, strong
 Professor: Evil, bad, genius
 Master Cylinder: Genius, robot, strong
 Poindexter: Smart, genius, helpful
 Marty: Mischievous, bad, strong
 Majorina/Esmeralda: Witch, good, tomboy
 Play-by-play Announcer: Genius, smart, glamorous

Episodes 
Each episode is half-hour long, and they each have four sub-episodes that make a storyline. After two sub-episodes is an in-between "Music-Time" segment (both 'Music-Time' segments are two minutes total).

Volume 1: His Magic Bag of Tricks

Volume 2: Magic Bag, Do Your Stuff

Volume 3: I Want my Chocolate!

Censorship in English 
 Episode 63 is no longer aired from Peacock as well as The Roku Channel

Citations

External links 
 Baby Felix & Friends Official Website

References 
 Baby Felix Official Website (archived)
 Pax-Koo's HomePage

2000 anime television series debuts
Japanese children's animated comedy television series
Japanese children's animated fantasy television series
Comedy anime and manga
Fantasy anime and manga
Felix the Cat television series
Animated television series about children
NHK original programming
Anime spin-offs
Child versions of cartoon characters
Animated television series about cats